WYXY is a radio station licensed for Savoy, Illinois on 99.1 MHz and owned by Saga Communications' Illini Radio Group.

WYXY formerly had the callsigns WIAI then WXLS.  It was sold from IAI Broadcasting to Saga Communications in 2004 and changed its callsign to WXTT.  During that time, the station was known on-air (popularly) as Extra 99.1. In early January 2010, the WXTT format was moved to 100.3 WIXY-HD2 and its analog translator 92.1 W221CK in Champaign and the "WIXY Classic" format that was being tested on those stations was moved to 99.1.  On January 9, 2010, 99.1 changed its callsign to WYXY.

WYXY had an associated broadcast translator, 99.7 W259BG Champaign, Illinois, which was W256BN until December 9, 2009, and before that was W250AT since July 8, 2004.

References

External links

YXY
Champaign County, Illinois